Moment of Truth is a Goa trance album by Man With No Name originally released in 1996.

The album was ranked as the 26th best album of 1996 by Muzik Magazine

Track listing

References

External links
Moment of Truth at Discogs

1996 albums